Hilary Minc (24 August 1905, Kazimierz Dolny – 26 November 1974, Warsaw) was a Polish economist and communist politician prominent in Stalinist Poland.

Minc was born into a middle class Jewish family; his parents were Oskar Minc and Stefania née Fajersztajn. In 1921 Minc joined the Communist Party of Poland, which was later eliminated by the Comintern before World War II. He studied law and economics in Poland and France, where he obtained a doctorate before being expelled by the authorities in 1928. During World War II he was exiled in the Soviet Union, where he participated in the founding and activities of the Union of Polish Patriots. As an officer in the Polish People's Army, he fought on the Eastern Front and received military decorations, including the Virtuti Militari. Between 1944 and 1956, he was a member of the Politburo of the Polish Workers' Party (PPR) and then the Polish United Workers' Party (PZPR).

Minc was a top-ranking member of Bolesław Bierut's political apparatus from 1948, together with Jakub Berman. He served as minister of industry and commerce and deputy prime minister for economic affairs during the Stalinist period in the Polish People's Republic (until 1956). Although his main responsibility was economy, he was a willing participant in political repressions of this period.  Minc participated in Władysław Gomułka's meetings with Joseph Stalin at the Kremlin. Stalin personally assigned Minc first to the Ministry of Industry and then to the Ministry of Transportation of Poland in 1949. Minc was one of the main architects of Poland's Six-Year Plan, implemented in 1950. His wife, Julia, was editor-in-chief of the Polish Press Agency until 1954.

At a celebration at Wrocław for the so-called Recovered Territories, Minc acclaimed the gaining of the completely equipped previously German land with its residue of German population which and proclaimed his government's right to liquidate the remaining Germans by appropriate methods.  

In 1956, during the Polish October, Minc was removed from the Politburo as well as from his position as Deputy Prime Minister. In 1959 he was expelled from PZPR altogether. He died in 1974 and was buried with full military and party honors at Powązki Military Cemetery.

References

External links
 Andrzej Walicki, Genuine fanatics (a review of Teresa Torańska's book  "Them": Stalin's Polish Puppets,  The New York Times, May 17, 1987).

1905 births
1974 deaths
People from Puławy County
People from Lublin Governorate
Jews from the Russian Empire
Jewish Polish politicians
Communist Party of Poland politicians
Polish Workers' Party politicians
Members of the Politburo of the Polish United Workers' Party
Deputy Prime Ministers of Poland
Members of the Polish Sejm 1947–1952
Members of the Polish Sejm 1952–1956
Jewish socialists
Polish People's Army personnel
Commanders with Star of the Order of Polonia Restituta
Recipients of the Silver Cross of the Virtuti Militari
Recipients of the Order of the Cross of Grunwald, 2nd class¨
Grand Crosses of the Order of the White Lion